San Diego Loyal Soccer Club is an American professional soccer team based in San Diego, California. The team was founded by Warren Smith and Landon Donovan. San Diego Loyal made its debut in 2020 as an expansion team in the USL Championship.

History 
On June 20, 2019, San Diego was awarded an expansion team in the USL Championship to debut in 2020 or 2021. Warren Smith, one of the co-founders of Sacramento Republic FC, was named the President of the new club. Former USMNT, LA Galaxy, and San Jose Earthquakes player Landon Donovan, was named the Executive Vice President of Soccer Operations. He was named as the club's first manager on November 14. The team's name and crest were developed through fan engagement to reflect the interests of the city. On March 7, 2020, the team played their first competitive match, a 1–1 draw against Las Vegas Lights FC at their home stadium, Torero Stadium. 

The Loyal forfeited a league match against LA Galaxy II on September 25, 2020 following an alleged use of a racial slur by Omar Ontiveros against Elijah Martin, one of the Loyal's Black players. The match had been played to a 1–1 draw and Ontiveros was later suspended for seven matches by the USL Championship. A week later, the team forfeited another match against Phoenix Rising FC by walking out after halftime following the alleged use of a homophobic slur against Collin Martin, an openly gay player, by Junior Flemmings. As a result of the two forfeits, the Loyal failed to qualify for the USL playoffs.

Stadium 
The team signed a three-year letter of commitment to play at Torero Stadium, with a series of one-year options for the following four years. The team will initially focus on building a fan base and brand at Torero, noting that the stadium could be expanded to a capacity of 8,000. Moreover, the team noted the possibility of sharing the prospective San Diego State University Snapdragon Stadium, at a 35,000 capacity, as a potential site for future years if they can cultivate the fan support.

Supporters 
The two officially recognized supporter groups are The Locals Supporters Group and Chavos De Loyal.

Sponsorship

Players and staff

Roster

Management and staff

Team records

Year-by-year

1. Top Scorer includes statistics from league matches only.

Head coaches
 Includes USL Regular Season, USL Playoffs, U.S. Open Cup. Excludes friendlies.

External links

References 

 
USL Championship teams
Association football clubs established in 2019
2019 establishments in California
Sports in San Diego